Alan Nicolás Marinelli (born 7 April 1999) is an Argentine professional footballer who plays as a winger for Rosario Central.

Club career
Marinelli is a product of Rosario Central's youth system; having joined in 2010. Towards the end of the 2018–19 season under manager Diego Cocca, Marinelli made his bow in professional football on 20 April 2019 during a Copa de la Superliga win away to Aldosivi; though their opponents progressed on aggregate. He scored a brace in a Copa de la Liga Profesional second phase victory over Patronato on 14 December 2020.

In February 2022, Marinelli joined Estudiantes on loan for one year with a purchase option. However, the spell was cut short and Marinelli was recalled on 11 July 2022.

International career
In 2018, Marinelli represented Argentina's U20s at the L'Alcúdia International Tournament in Spain. They won the competition, as Marinelli scored the winning goal in the final against Russia. He also received call-ups to train against the senior team.

Career statistics
.

Honours
Argentina U20
 L'Alcúdia International Tournament: 2018

Notes

References

External links

1999 births
Living people
Footballers from Rosario, Santa Fe
Argentine people of Italian descent
Argentine footballers
Argentina youth international footballers
Argentina under-20 international footballers
Association football forwards
Argentine Primera División players
Rosario Central footballers
Estudiantes de La Plata footballers